Sociology Lens is a peer-reviewed journal is edited by an international panel of historians, anthropologists, geographers and sociologists. Previously named the Journal of Historical Sociology, the journal is both interdisciplinary in approach and innovative in content. Sociology Lens was founded in 1988 and presents review essays and commentary in its "Issues and Agendas" section, and aims to provoke discussion and debate.

Abstracting and Indexing 
Sociology Lens is abstracted and indexed in the Social Sciences Citation Index. According to the Journal Citation Reports, it has a 2017 impact factor of 0.767.

References 

Sociology journals